Reginald Edmund Compton Butterworth (16 August 1906 – 21 May 1940) was an English cricketer who played at first-class level for Oxford University and Middlesex.

Early life

Butterworth was born in Semarang, Java (then part of the Dutch East Indies), and was educated at Harrow School  before going on to Christ Church, Oxford. He made his first-class debut for Oxford in May 1926. Butterworth's maiden first-class century came the following season, when he made 101 against the Free Foresters. He also scored 110 against Surrey a few games later, which was to be his highest first-class score. Butterworth made his County Championship debut for Middlesex in 1935, against Warwickshire, and played two further seasons at the county. In 1937, he toured Ceylon and Malaya with a team organised by Sir Julien Cahn, which was his only overseas tour. Butterworth's final first-class appearance came in May 1939, when he played for the Marylebone Cricket Club (MCC) against Yorkshire.

Military service and death

In the Second World War, Butterworth enlisted with the Royal Air Force (RAF). In May 1940, while serving as an air gunner with the rank of pilot officer on a Westland Lysander captained by Flight Lieutenant Richard Graham as part No. 13 Squadron, Butterworth was shot down over Saint-Omer and crashed near Saint-Martin-au-Laërt, killing him and Graham. His older brother, John Compton Butterworth, who was also a first-class cricketer, was killed in action less than a year later.

See also
 List of cricketers who were killed during military service

References

External links
 
 

1906 births
1940 deaths
Royal Air Force personnel killed in World War II
English cricketers
Marylebone Cricket Club cricketers
Middlesex cricketers
Oxford University cricketers
People educated at Harrow School
Alumni of Christ Church, Oxford
People from Semarang
Royal Air Force Volunteer Reserve personnel of World War II
H. D. G. Leveson Gower's XI cricketers
Royal Air Force officers